These are casinos and highly exclusive slot machine VIP clubs located in major cities across the country. Philippine Amusement and Gaming Corporation (PAGCOR) operates most of casinos and slot machine clubs in the Philippines.

Luzon

Central Luzon
Golden Nile Bar & Casino, Angeles City
Wild Orchid Resort & Poker Room, Angeles City
Casino Filipino Angeles, Angeles City
Casino Filipino Olongapo, Olongapo
Subic Venecia Casino, Subic Bay Freeport Zone
Oriental Paradise Casino, Subic Bay Freeport Zone
Royce Hotel and Casino, Clark, Pampanga

Metro Manila

Calabarzon
Casino Filipino San Pedro, San Pedro, Laguna
Casino Filipino Tagaytay, Tagaytay, Cavite
Casino Filipino Cavite, Bacoor, Cavite
Casino Filipino Laguna, Sta. Rosa, Laguna

Visayas

Western Visayas
Casino Filipino Bacolod, Bacolod
Arcade-Amigo Hotel, Iloilo City

Central Visayas
Nustar Resort & Casino, Cebu City
Waterfront Cebu City Hotel & Casino, Cebu City

Mindanao

General Santos 
Grand Imperial by Casino Filipino

Davao
Casino Filipino

Cagayan de Oro

See also
 Gambling in the Philippines

References 

Casinos
Philippines
Casinos